"Bonnie & Clyde" is a song by Swiss rapper Loredana and Kosovo-Albanian rapper Mozzik. The song was written by Loredana and Mozzik along with German producers Macloud and Miksu, who also handled the production. It was independently released as a single for digital download and streaming on 14 September 2018. An Albanian and German-language uptempo hip hop and R&B song, it contains Balkan elements. Inspired by Bonnie and Clyde, the song is lyrically about both rappers confessing that they only are after the money. The accompanying music video was uploaded to YouTube in September 2018. Music critics generally received "Bonnie & Clyde" with favorable reviews, complimenting the music and lyrics as well as the rappers' collaboration. The song was a commercial success, reaching number two in both Austria and Switzerland, as well as number three in Germany. It has been also awarded gold certifications by the Austrian International Federation of the Phonographic Industry (IFPI Austria) and German Bundesverband Musikindustrie (BVMI).

Background and composition 

Prior to the release of "Bonnie & Clyde", Loredana signed a contract with the German subsidiary of Sony Music in September 2018 and announced the release of an upcoming single. Then, "Bonnie & Clyde" was made available for digital download and streaming on 14 September 2018. The single, with its title alluding to the American criminal couple Bonnie and Clyde, marked the first collaboration between the couple Loredana and Mozzik. The song was written by Loredana, Mozzik, Macloud (Laurin Auth) and Miksu (Joshua Allery), with the production handled by the latter two. Musically, "Bonnie & Clyde" is an uptempo hip hop and R&B-described song, which incorporates Balkan elements. Performed in German with some lyrics by Mozzik in Albanian, both rappers lyrically confess that they only are after the money.

Reception and promotion 

"Bonnie & Clyde" received mainly positive reviews upon its release. Martin Seebacher from Red Bull complimented the song's Balkan and uptempo sounds, stating that it is a "perfect" symbiosis of "classic and hip hop". Mira Weingart from the same website praised Mozzik's Albanian-language lyrics, labelling them as "smooth", and wrote that "even if you do not understand it, you want to bounce and party to it". Yma Nowak from Hiphop De found Loredana's rhyming techniques to be "catchy", while the staff of laut.de further described them as "simple". "Bonnie & Clyde" reached number two in both Austria and Switzerland, having since received a gold certification in the former country from the Austrian International Federation of the Phonographic Industry (IFPI Austria). In Germany, the single experienced similar success, peaking at number three on the Official German Charts, and received a gold certification there from the German Bundesverband Musikindustrie (BVMI). Loredana uploaded the music video for "Bonnie & Clyde" to her YouTube channel on 14 September 2018. Produced by Bilal Hadzic and Mohamed Elbouhlali, the video received 11 million YouTube views in less than a week.

Credits and personnel 

Credits adapted from Spotify.
 Loredanasongwriting, vocals
 Mozzik (Gramoz Aliu)songwriting, vocals
 Macloud (Laurin Auth)songwriting, producing
 Miksu (Joshua Allery)songwriting, producing

Track listing 
 Digital download and streaming
 "Bonnie & Clyde"2:55

Charts

Certifications

Release history

References 

2018 singles
2018 songs
Hip hop songs
Loredana Zefi songs
Mozzik songs
Rhythm and blues songs
Albanian-language songs
German-language songs
Song recordings produced by Macloud
Song recordings produced by Miksu
Songs written by Loredana Zefi